Mulka Station is a pastoral lease that operates as a cattle station in the far north of South Australia. The land occupying the extent of the Mulka Station pastoral lease   was gazetted as a locality by the Government of South Australia on 26 April 2013  under the name "Mulka".

Geography
The main vehicular access to the property is via the unpaved Birdsville Track.

Climate

Drought had gripped the area in early 1929 with George Aiston predicting that if it did not break by the end of 1929 then the area would be deserted by both Europeans and Indigenous Australians.

In 2005 drought conditions were so bad that the property was completely destocked. By 2010 the rains had arrived further north so that Cooper Creek was flowing again as far as Lake Eyre.

History 
Both Lake Hope and Red Lake are situated within the station boundaries.

Established prior to 1889 the property used to be stocked with sheep.

George "Poddy" Aiston acquired Mulka in about 1923, he had previously worked as a policeman at Mungerannie after returning from the Boer War in 1902. By 1925 he had built the Mulka Store near the Mulka Bore along the Birdsville Track. The Mulka Store Ruins are listed on the South Australian Heritage Register. From 1933 to 1934 the  property was struck by drought again with Aiston being unsure if his 1,000 head of cattle were even alive. In late 1934 the property was struck by dust storms and then rain with the creeks flooding. George Aiston died in 1943 but his wife Mabel remained running the store until 1951.

Airmail delivery to remote properties in outback South Australia, New South Wales and Queensland commenced in 1949. Mulka along with other remote properties including Mungerannie, Clifton Hills, Glengyle, Davenport Downs, Morney Plains, Mount Leonard, Durrie, Cordillo Downs, Tanbar, Durham Downs, Nappa Merrie, Lake Pure and Naryilco were also on the route.

After Lake Hope was filled by three consecutive floods in 1989, 1990 and 1991 Mulka Station owners Denis Overton and his wife Gabrielle Overton were granted a Fishing Licence in 1991. 
In 2000 the Fisheries licence for Mulka Station was passed on from Denis Overton to his Brother Gary Overton.

Gary Overton got to use his fishing licence to start catching Lake Eyre Golden Perch in the waters of Lake Hope.

The station was also stocked with approximately 3,000 head of cattle.

See also
List of ranches and stations
List of the largest stations in Australia

References

Pastoral leases in South Australia
Stations (Australian agriculture)
Far North (South Australia)